Serhiy Volodymyrovych Semenyuk, formerly Serhiy Zayika (born as ; born 27 January 1991) is a Ukrainian professional football who plays as a midfielder for German club VfB Krieschow.

References

External links
 
 

1991 births
Living people
People from Izyaslav
Ukrainian footballers
Ukraine youth international footballers
Association football midfielders
FC Shakhtar Donetsk players
FC Shakhtar-3 Donetsk players
FC Enerhetyk Burshtyn players
FC Dynamo Brest players
FC Šiauliai players
FC Poltava players
FC Arsenal Kyiv players
FC Ahrobiznes Volochysk players
Ukrainian Premier League players
Ukrainian First League players
Ukrainian Second League players
Belarusian Premier League players
A Lyga players
Ukrainian expatriate footballers
Expatriate footballers in Belarus
Ukrainian expatriate sportspeople in Belarus
Expatriate footballers in Lithuania
Ukrainian expatriate sportspeople in Lithuania
Expatriate footballers in Germany
Ukrainian expatriate sportspeople in Germany
Sportspeople from Khmelnytskyi Oblast